Just Mustard are an Irish rock band. They formed in Dundalk in County Louth in 2016.

Career
Their debut album, Wednesday, was released in 2018 through Pizza Pizza Records. Self-produced and recorded by the band in their home studio in Dundalk and in Start Together Studios, Belfast, with recording engineer Chris Ryan, Wednesday was nominated for the Choice Music Prize in 2018.

In 2020, the band signed to Brooklyn-based label Partisan Records, which released their sophomore album, Heart Under, in May 2022. The album peaked at No. 17 in the Irish albums chart and received critical acclaim upon its release.

Personnel

 Katie Ball (vocals)
David Noonan (guitar/vocals)
 Mete Kalyon (guitar)
Rob Clarke (bass)
Shane Maguire (drums)

Discography

Albums
Wednesday (2018)
Heart Under (2022)

EPs
Just Mustard (2016)
Live Session (Park Time Punks KXLU) (2020)

Singles
"Frank // October" (2019)
"Seven" (2019)
"I Am You" (2021)

References

External links 
Just Mustard on Bandcamp

Musical groups from County Louth
Irish post-punk music groups
Shoegazing musical groups
2016 establishments in Ireland